Brunswick County is the name of two counties in the United States:

 Brunswick County, North Carolina 
 Brunswick County, Virginia

In fiction
 Brunswick County, Florida is a fictional location in John Grisham's novel The Whistler